Jürgen Rebel (born 17 July 1963) is a German table tennis player. He competed in the men's doubles event at the 1988 Summer Olympics.

References

1963 births
Living people
German male table tennis players
Olympic table tennis players of West Germany
Table tennis players at the 1988 Summer Olympics
Sportspeople from Darmstadt
20th-century German people